Coelopa is a genus of kelp flies in the family Coelopidae. There are about 14 described species in Coelopa.

Species
These 12 species belong to the genus Coelopa:
Subgenus Coelopa Meigen, 1830
C. pilipes Haliday, 1838
Subgenus Fucomyia Haliday, 1837
C. aequatorialis Bezzi, 1892
C. alluaudi Séguy, 1941
C. dasypoda Bezzi, 1908
C. frigida (Fabricius, 1805) (seaweed fly)
C. nebularum Aldrich, 1929
C. orientalis Macquart, 1843
C. stejnegeri Aldrich, 1929
C. ursina (Wiedemann, 1824)
Subgenus Neocoelopa Malloch, 1933
C. vanduzeei Cresson, 1914
Nomen dubium
C. fumifer (Walker, 1861)
C. glabra Walker, 1849
C. offendens Walker, 1861

Coelopa frigida
Coelopa frigida is one of the most widely distribute species of seaweed fly. This species is found on the shorelines of the temperate Northern Hemisphere. Often confused for the morphologically similar Coelopa nebularum and Coelopa pilipes. C. frigida feeds primarily on seaweed and stay around these habitats.

References

Further reading

 

Coelopidae
Articles created by Qbugbot
Sciomyzoidea genera